Guillermo Peralta (21 July 1908 – 23 September 1975) was an Argentine sailor. He competed in the 8 Metre event at the 1936 Summer Olympics.

References

External links
 

1908 births
1975 deaths
Argentine male sailors (sport)
Olympic sailors of Argentina
Sailors at the 1936 Summer Olympics – 8 Metre
Sportspeople from Buenos Aires